The Heidelstein transmitter is a facility for FM- and TV-broadcasting on the Heidelstein mountain in the Rhön, in Germany. It uses as an antenna, a 218 metre tall guyed mast of tubular steel, which weighs 245 tons and was built in 1969. The Heidelstein transmitter is the property of Deutsche Telekom.

See also
 List of famous transmission sites

Radio masts and towers in Germany
Rhön Mountains
1969 establishments in West Germany
Towers completed in 1969